Dan A. Gwadosky (February 16, 1954 – August 10, 2011) was an American politician from Maine. A Democrat, Gwadosky was first elected to the Maine House of Representatives in 1978 at the age of 23 and served there for 18 years as well as 8 years as Secretary of State of Maine from 1997 to 2005. Beginning in 2005, Gwadosky was appointed Director of the Bureau of Alcoholic Beverages and Lottery Operations. He was Speaker of the Maine House of Representatives from 1994 to 1996.

Personal and education
Gwadosky was born in Waterville, Maine and grew up in nearby Fairfield, Maine, where he attended Lawrence High School. He earned a B.S. in Management and a M.A. in Computer Technology from Thomas College in Waterville. He was married to Cheryl Norton, who works for Sappi fine paper in Skowhegan.They have two children and lived in Augusta. Gwadosky died in August 2011 of pancreatic cancer.

References

1954 births
2011 deaths
People from Fairfield, Maine
Thomas College alumni
Secretaries of State of Maine
Speakers of the Maine House of Representatives
Democratic Party members of the Maine House of Representatives
Majority leaders of the Maine House of Representatives
Deaths from cancer in Maine
Deaths from pancreatic cancer